is a 2014 visual novel produced by Toybox Inc. for the PlayStation 3 and PlayStation Vita. It was originally released in Japan by Arc System Works and was released in North America by Aksys Games in Europe by NIS America in 2015. An updated version with a reworked battle system, titled Tokyo Twilight Ghost Hunters Daybreak: Special Gigs, first released in Japan in 2015 before releasing worldwide for PlayStation 3, PlayStation 4, PlayStation Vita, and Windows.

The game includes adventure game and visual novel gameplay, as well as strategy role-playing elements.

Reception

Hardcore Gamer gave the game a 2 out of 5 score, and criticized the lack of explanations for many of the elements of the game, such as the icon-based system for responding to characters, while also praising the character animation.

Erren Van Duine of PlayStation LifeStyle also disliked the lack of in-game explanations, but gave praise in particular to the art style, character animation, backgrounds, story, and the English localization, while criticizing the role-playing segments for being too frustrating and luck-based.

References

External links 
 Official North American website
 Official European website

2014 video games
Adventure games
Arc System Works games
Nippon Ichi Software games
PlayStation 3 games
PlayStation 4 games
PlayStation Vita games
PQube games
Tactical role-playing video games
Video games developed in Japan
Video games set in Tokyo
Visual novels
Windows games